The John S. and Elizabeth Beem Holmes Barn is a historic building located on a farm southwest of St. Charles, Iowa, United States. The Holmes' settled in Madison County in 1854 from Indiana. John Holmes farmed, raised livestock, and held several local offices in the community. This building is a fine example of a vernacular limestone farm building. The 1½-story structure is composed of large blocks of locally quarried finished cut stone. It is equivalent in height to a three-story building. There was an attempt some time ago to stucco the structure in order to preserve the stone, however, a storm a few hours after it was applied washed most of it off. It was listed on the National Register of Historic Places in 1987.

References

Infrastructure completed in 1875
Vernacular architecture in Iowa
Buildings and structures in Madison County, Iowa
National Register of Historic Places in Madison County, Iowa
Barns on the National Register of Historic Places in Iowa